Monroe Wilson House is a historic home located at Ridgeway, Fairfield County, South Carolina.  It was built about 1890, and is a two-story, rectangular, frame Victorian vernacular house. It features a porch that runs along the façade and southeast elevation with square posts and elaborate brackets. There is a small second story porch over the front entrance.

It was added to the National Register of Historic Places in 1980.

References

Houses on the National Register of Historic Places in South Carolina
Victorian architecture in South Carolina
Houses completed in 1890
Houses in Fairfield County, South Carolina
National Register of Historic Places in Fairfield County, South Carolina